Idaho wine refers to wine made from the U.S. state of Idaho. Idaho has a long history of wine production with the first vineyards in the Pacific Northwest being planted here in the 1860s. Like in other areas Prohibition in the United States virtually wiped out the Idaho wine industry in the early twentieth century, only to be resurrected in the 1970s. Today Idaho's wine industry is its fastest growing agricultural industry.

Geography and climate
Located in the Pacific Northwest, the wine regions of Idaho resembles Eastern Washington though the region is affected by a greater diurnal temperature variation. The average vineyard in Idaho sits at an altitude of  among the foothills of the Rocky Mountains. A benefit of global warming has limited the severity of Idaho winters on the vineyards which were devastated with frost during the 1970s and 1980s.

Since that era, the effect of global warming has been beneficial to the vineyards of southwestern Idaho. That said, a severe frost in 2016 cost many growers a significant number of vines.

To grow better wines in the vineyards, several viticultural practices common in Idaho including the use of open canopies over the vines, drip irrigation and aggressive pruning to ensure lower yields.

Grapes
Since the 1970s, Idaho wine has been known for its cool climate white varietals like Riesling (including Ice wine), Chenin blanc, Chardonnay and Gewürztraminer. In recent years there have been an increased focus on red wine productions, notably Cabernet Sauvignon, Merlot and Syrah.

Grape production
In 1999, the Idaho Department of Agriculture reported a total of twenty-three farms producing wine grapes. By the 2006 report, a total of forty-nine farms were included in the census. This represents a growth of 85.8% over the 1999 survey. Canyon County vineyards contain 81% of the state's total inventory of grape vines. As of 2017, The Idaho Wine Commission reports on about 1300 acres of grapes planted with expansions planned in each of the existing AVAs.

Industry values

2013
In 2013, Idaho's Wine Industry had a $169.3 million impact, up from $73 million just five years before in 2008.

Wineries and AVAs

The majority of the state's wineries are located in the Snake River valley west of Boise. Currently there are 52 wineries in Idaho.

The Snake River Valley in Southwestern Idaho and two counties in Oregon was officially designated an American Viticultural Area (AVA) by the US Alcohol and Tobacco Tax and Trade Bureau (TTB). A petition was filed by the growers in the Snake River Valley, the Idaho Grape Growers and Wine Producers Commission, and the Idaho Department of Commerce and Labor. The petition was granted in 2007, and for wines to bear the Snake River Valley AVA label, at least 85% of the grapes used for production must be grown in the designated area. Vintners may now use the term to describe Idaho and Oregon wines made from grapes grown in that geographic area.

The Eagle Foothills AVA gained its designation in November 2015. It is credited as a specialized grape-growing region because of the influence of nearby Prospect Peak at 4,874 feet in elevation and the granite pebbles mixed with volcanic ash/sandy loam as a result of Ancient Lake Idaho.

Popular culture

In the 1969 film Cactus Flower (based on two earlier plays) Ingrid Bergman reads the label of a bottle in a nightclub and says, "I didn't know they made champagne in Idaho."  Later in the film, she tells her date, "Let's have some of that crazy Idaho champagne!"

Cloris Leachman delivers a similar line in a 1971 episode of The Mary Tyler Moore Show as Phyllis Lindstrom.  When Mary presents a bottle of champagne to celebrate a new job, Phyllis reads the label and says, "I didn't know they even made it in Idaho."

The gag gets extended treatment in The Muppet Movie from 1979, as Kermit the Frog orders a bottle of wine from the waiter (played by Steve Martin) to share with Miss Piggy.  When the bottle arrives, Miss Piggy exclaims, "You mad impetuous thing—it's champagne!" to which Martin interjects, "Not exactly.  Sparkling muscatel—one of the finest wines of Idaho."  Martin later asks Kermit, "Don't you want to smell the bottle cap?" and, when Kermit asks the waiter to taste it for him, Martin dramatically spits it out, and says, "Excellent choice."  "Should be, for 95¢," Kermit snarks to Miss Piggy.

See also

List of wineries in Idaho

References

External links
 Idaho Wine Commission 
  TTB AVA Map

 
Agriculture in Idaho
Wine regions of the United States by state